Real Gone is the sixteenth studio album by Tom Waits, released October 3, 2004 in Europe, and October 5 in United States on the ANTI- label. The album was supported by the Real Gone Tour, playing sold out locations in North America and Europe in October and November 2004.

The album features some of the few political songs Waits has written, the most explicit being "Day After Tomorrow", a song Waits has described as an "elliptical" protest against the Iraq War.

It was chosen by the editors of Harp Magazine as the best album of 2004.

A remixed, remastered version of the album was released by ANTI- on November 22, 2017, with the remastering process personally overseen by Tom Waits and Kathleen Brennan. In 2021, singer-songwriter Phoebe Bridgers covered "Day After Tomorrow".

Track listing
All songs written by Tom Waits and Kathleen Brennan.

 "Top of the Hill" – 4:55
 "Hoist That Rag" – 4:20
 "Sins of My Father" – 10:36
 "Shake It" – 3:52
 "Don't Go into That Barn" – 5:22
 "How's It Gonna End" – 4:51
 "Metropolitan Glide" – 4:13
 "Dead and Lovely" – 5:40
 "Circus" – 3:56
 "Trampled Rose" – 3:58
 "Green Grass" – 3:13
 "Baby Gonna Leave Me" – 4:29
 "Clang Boom Steam" – 0:46
 "Make It Rain" – 3:39
 "Day After Tomorrow" – 6:56
 "Chick a Boom" – 1:17 (hidden track)

Personnel
Brain – percussion (tracks 1–5, 7, 10 and 12), claps (track 4)
Les Claypool – bass (tracks 2, 4 and 12)
Harry K. Cody – guitar (tracks 5 and 7), banjo (track 6)
Mark Howard – bells (track 9), claps (track 4)
Marc Ribot – guitar (tracks 1–4, 8, 11, 12, 14 and 15), banjo (track 3), cigar box banjo (track 10)
Larry Taylor – bass (tracks 1, 3, 5–8, 10–12, 14 and 15), guitar (tracks 4 and 5)
Casey Waits – drums (tracks 8, 9 and 14), turntables (tracks 1 and 7), percussion (tracks 2 and 5), claps (track 4)
Tom Waits – vocals, guitar (tracks 3, 6, 7, 11 and 15), chamberlin (track 9), percussion (track 5), shakers (track 12), beatboxing (tracks 1, 7, 12, 13 and 16)
Trisha Wilson – claps (track 4)

Chart positions

References

2004 albums
Tom Waits albums
Anti- (record label) albums